Tukkiyampalayam is a village in the Vazhapadi taluk of Salem district, in Tamil Nadu, India.

Geography
Tukkiyampalayam is within Vazhapadi taluk, which is in the central part of Salem district.

Demographics
In 2011 Tukkiyampalayam had a population of 5,385 people living in 1,394 households. 2,769 (51.4%) of the inhabitants were male, while 2,616 (48.6%) were female. 614 children in the town, about 11% of the population, were at or below the age of 6. The literacy rate in the town was 62.1%. Scheduled Castes and Scheduled Tribes accounted for 28.4% and 0.01% of the population, respectively.

References

Villages in Salem district
Villages in Vazhapadi taluk